Manresa House may refer to:

 Manresa House, Dublin, Republic of Ireland
 Manresa Jesuit Spiritual Renewal Centre, in Pickering, Ontario, Canada
 Manresa Spirituality Centre, Quebec, Canada
 Parkstead House, formerly Manresa House, London, UK

See also
Manresa (disambiguation)